The following highways are numbered 137:

Canada
  Ontario Highway 137
  Prince Edward Island Route 137
  Quebec Route 137

Costa Rica
  National Route 137

Japan
  Japan National Route 137
  Fukuoka Prefectural Route 137
  Nara Prefectural Route 137

Malaysia
  Malaysia Federal Route 137

United States
  Alabama State Route 137
  Arkansas Highway 137
  California State Route 137
  Connecticut Route 137
  Florida State Road 137 (former)
  County Road 137 (Hamilton County, Florida)
  County Road 137 (Suwannee County, Florida)
  Georgia State Route 137
  Hawaii Route 137
  Illinois Route 137
  Iowa Highway 137
  K-137 (Kansas highway)
  Kentucky Route 137
  Louisiana Highway 137 (former)
  Maine State Route 137
  Maryland Route 137
  Massachusetts Route 137
  M-137 (Michigan highway) (former)
  Missouri Route 137
  Nebraska Highway 137
  New Hampshire Route 137
  New Mexico State Road 137
  New York State Route 137
  County Route 137 (Cortland County, New York)
  County Route 137 (Erie County, New York)
  County Route 137 (Fulton County, New York)
  County Route 137 (Niagara County, New York)
  County Route 137 (Schenectady County, New York)
  County Route 137 (Westchester County, New York)
  North Carolina Highway 137
  Ohio State Route 137
  Oklahoma State Highway 137
  Pennsylvania Route 137 (former)
  South Carolina Highway 137
  Tennessee State Route 137
  Texas State Highway 137
  Texas State Highway Loop 137 (two former highways)
  Farm to Market Road 137
  Utah State Route 137
  Virginia State Route 137
  Virginia State Route 137 (1930-1932) (former)
  Wisconsin Highway 137
  Wyoming Highway 137 (former)

Territories
  Puerto Rico Highway 137